Zeliomima is a genus of parasitic flies in the family Tachinidae.

Species
Zeliomima caudata Mesnil, 1976
Zeliomima chaetosa Mensil, 1976

References

Dexiinae
Diptera of Africa
Tachinidae genera